The Amazon pigmy gecko (Pseudogonatodes guianensis) is a species of lizard in the Sphaerodactylidae family found in northern South America in Colombia, Venezuela, the Guianas (Guyana, French Guiana, Suriname), Brazil, Ecuador, and northern Peru.

References

Pseudogonatodes
Reptiles of Brazil
Reptiles of Colombia
Reptiles of Ecuador
Reptiles of French Guiana
Reptiles of Guyana
Reptiles of Peru
Reptiles of Suriname
Reptiles described in 1935
Taxa named by Hampton Wildman Parker